Mike Spegal (born April 6, 1968 in Newton, Iowa) is a former Marine and currently owns a UPS store.  In 2006, he won his entry into the World Series of Poker Main event in an Online Satellite.  In 2007, he defeated Gavin Smith to win a WSOP bracelet in the $1,500 Pot-Limit Hold'em event.

As of 2008, Mike Spegal has live tournament winnings in excess of $260,000.

World Series of Poker bracelets

References

American poker players
World Series of Poker bracelet winners
People from Newton, Iowa
1968 births
Living people